Xia Huan (born 30 January 1992) is a Chinese badminton doubles player.

Career 
Xia became World Junior Champion in the girls' doubles event in 2009 with Tang Jinhua held in Alor Setar, Malaysia. One year later in Guadalajara, Mexico, the pair almost managed to defend their World Juniors title, reaching the final, which they eventually lost to compatriots Bao Yixin and Ou Dongni (13–21, 18–21). The pair also won the 2009 and 2010 Asian Junior Championships.

In 2011, Xia Huan and Tang Jinhua won their first major title, the China Masters Superseries. They also reached the semi-finals at the 2011 Korea Grand Prix Gold, and the final at the China Open Superseries. In 2012, Xia and Tang won the German and Swiss Open Grand Prix Gold.

Achievements

Asian Championships 
Women's doubles

Mixed doubles

BWF World Junior Championships 
Girls' doubles

Mixed doubles

Asian Junior Championships 
Girls' doubles

Mixed doubles

BWF Superseries 
The BWF Superseries, which was launched on 14 December 2006 and implemented in 2007, is a series of elite badminton tournaments, sanctioned by the Badminton World Federation (BWF). BWF Superseries levels are Superseries and Superseries Premier. A season of Superseries consists of twelve tournaments around the world that have been introduced since 2011. Successful players are invited to the Superseries Finals, which are held at the end of each year.

Women's doubles

  BWF Superseries Finals tournament
  BWF Superseries Premier tournament
  BWF Superseries tournament

BWF Grand Prix 
The BWF Grand Prix had two levels, the BWF Grand Prix and Grand Prix Gold. It was a series of badminton tournaments sanctioned by the Badminton World Federation (BWF) which was held from 2007 to 2017.

Women's doubles

Mixed doubles

  BWF Grand Prix Gold tournament
  BWF Grand Prix tournament

BWF International Challenge/Series 
Mixed doubles

  BWF International Challenge tournament
  BWF International Series tournament

References

External links 

1992 births
Living people
People from Yiyang
Badminton players from Hunan
Chinese female badminton players